Buffalo is the name of some places in the U.S. state of Wisconsin:

Buffalo County, Wisconsin
Buffalo City, Wisconsin, a city
Buffalo, Buffalo County, Wisconsin, a town
Buffalo, Marquette County, Wisconsin, a town